Dolf Benz (15 September 1908 – 14 December 1988) was a Dutch sprinter. He competed in the men's 100 metres at the 1928 Summer Olympics.

References

External links
 

1908 births
1988 deaths
Athletes (track and field) at the 1928 Summer Olympics
Dutch male sprinters
Olympic athletes of the Netherlands
Athletes from Amsterdam